The Statue of Sir Walter Scott is a Category C listed monument at the South Inch public park in Perth, Perth and Kinross, Scotland. Standing where Marshall Place and King's Place merge, at King Street, it is dedicated to Sir Walter Scott, author of The Fair Maid of Perth in 1828. The statue is the work of John Cochrane and Brothers, and was completed in 1845 as one of their final works before leaving for Canada. It was accidentally acquired by the city magistrates at the sale of a local sculptor's stock. The statue originally stood at the eastern end of Perth's High Street, but was removed to its current location in 1877.

It stands upon a corniced square-plan stone plinth raised on two plinths and surmounted by a stone statue depicting the subject. The figure is standing, facing north to King Street, swathed in a toga, with his right hand resting on broken column and his Scottish Deerhound, Maida, lying at his feet. An inscription reads SIR WALTER SCOTT BT 1771–1832.

The part of the statue of Scott's dog was stolen in 2020. It was also stolen in 2016.

An iron railing originally surrounded the statue and at least part of the South Inch's boundary. As with the majority of the city's iron railings, they were removed to be made into artillery for the wars.

Gallery

See also
List of listed buildings in Perth, Scotland

References

External links
Perth, King's Place, Sir Walter Scott Statue – Canmore

Walter Scott
1845 sculptures
1845 establishments in Scotland
Listed buildings in Perth, Scotland
Category C listed buildings in Perth and Kinross
Listed monuments and memorials in Scotland
Outdoor sculptures in Scotland
Statues in Scotland
Stone sculptures
Statues of writers